The David Whitney House is a historic mansion located at 4421 Woodward Avenue in Midtown Detroit, Michigan. The building was constructed during the 1890s as a private residence. It was restored in 1986 and is now a restaurant. The building was listed on the National Register of Historic Places in 1972.

History and construction

The house was built between 1890 and 1894 by a prominent lumber baron, David Whitney Jr., who was considered not only one of Detroit's wealthiest personalities, but also one of Michigan's wealthiest citizens. The house is estimated to have cost 400,000 (equal to $ today), and it was featured in several newspapers of that time.

The exterior is constructed using pink jasper from South Dakota. It is measured to be 21,000 square feet (2,000 m2) and has 52 rooms (including 10 bathrooms), 218 windows, 20 fireplaces, a secret vault in the dining room, an elevator, and numerous Tiffany glass windows.

The Tiffany glass windows have been estimated to be worth more than the house itself. The window designs often feature themes oriented around the purpose of the rooms they are located in. For example, the music room's windows are themed towards elements of music as well as images of Saint Cecilia, the patron saint of music. The grand staircase features a massive stained glass window portraying a knight, paying homage to the various members of the Whitney family who were knighted, as well as their relationship to the royal blood line in England. The house was the first residence in Detroit to have a functioning elevator for personal use.

David Whitney Jr.

David Whitney Jr. was born in 1830 in Watertown, Massachusetts. Whitney made his millions in Massachusetts as a lumber baron. He moved to Detroit from Lowell (where he had established himself as a lumber baron) in 1857, at the young age of twenty-seven. Starting a joint venture with his brother Charles, he continued to expand his vastly successful lumber business into Ohio, Indiana, and Pennsylvania.

Upon arriving in Detroit, he surrounded himself by the community's wealthiest and most respectable families. Whitney soon earned the nickname of "Mr. Woodward Avenue", due to his keen interest in real estate around the Detroit area.

Whitney was always fascinated by the Detroit Athletic Club (DAC). Ever since the DAC's establishment in 1887, it has been revered as "one of the finest private clubs in the country, an elite organization deeply committed to upholding the traditions and elegance of its glorious pasts". Part of the DAC's grounds is now under the possession of Wayne State University. Included among the elite members of the original DAC were Whitney and his son David C. Whitney. This influenced his choice for the location of the Whitney House, as it overlooked the grounds of the DAC. The Whitney mansion was built between 1890 and 1894, and estimated to have cost approximately $400,000.
After Whitney's death in 1900, his family continued to reside in the mansion until 1920. It was converted into an upscale restaurant in 1986. Today, many of the members of the Whitney family reside in the Grosse Pointe area.

Hauntings

Dating back to the renovations in the mid-1980s, there have been rumored occurrences of supernatural activities on all three floors of the Whitney house. The causes of these events have been linked to the story of David Whitney Jr. and his wife both dying inside the mansion. To this day, some people believe that the ghost of David Whitney Jr. haunts the Whitney mansion.
One of the most haunted areas in the house appears to be the elevator. There are reports of the elevator moving on its own between the floors without any passengers. Other unexplained apparitions have been reported on the second and third floors. One evening at closing, a staff member witnessed an older gentleman gazing out of the second floor dining room window; when he was asked to leave, the figure simply vanished into the floor. Reports by the mansion's staff members of sounds of utensils being stacked and table settings being moved all on their own, have only added to the mystery of the Whitney mansion.

In the media
The David Whitney House was featured in SYFY channel's paranormal TV series Ghost Hunters in 2016 where the TAPS team investigated reported activity inside and outside the property.

The house, called the Whitney Mansion, was featured as one of the haunted locations on Most Terrifying Places in America on the episode titled "Restless Dead" which aired on the Travel Channel in 2018.

See also
Cultural Center Historic District (Detroit)

References

Further reading

External links

The Whitney Restaurant
Historic Detroit – David Whitney House

Houses in Detroit
Houses completed in 1894
Restaurants in Detroit
Whitney
Historic district contributing properties in Michigan
Whitney
Whitney
Restaurants established in 1986
Romanesque Revival architecture in Michigan
1894 establishments in Michigan
Historic district contributing properties in Indiana
Gilded Age mansions